The Volobe Power Station is a proposed  hydroelectric power project in Madagascar. The project is owned and is under development by a consortium comprising (a) Jovena, a subsidiary of the Axian Group (b) SN Power of Norway (c) Africa50 and (d) Colas Madagascar. The 750 GWh of clean energy generated here annually will be sold directly to Jirama, the national electricity utility company under a 35 year power purchase agreement (PPA).

Location
The power station is planned across the Ivondro River, in the Toamasina Rural District, in Toamasina Province.

Overview
Volobe HPP is a run of river plant with six  Francis type generating turbines, each rated at 20 megawatts. Andritz Hydro will supply and install the turbines, for total generating capacity of 120 megawatts.

The consortium that is developing the power station will also build the high voltage evacuation power line that will transmit the energy from this power plant to a point where the energy will enter the national electricity grid. In addition, access roads and other infrastructure will be constructed for the neighboring communities.

Developers
The consortium that owns the power station and is developing it has four shareholder companies as illustrated in the table below. They formed a special purpose vehicle company (SPV) to own, design, build, finance, operate and maintain the power station. The SPV company is called Compagnie Générale d'Hydroélectricité de Volobe (CGHV) (English: General Hydroelectricity Company of Volobe).

Construction costs and funding
It is estimated that construction will cost approximately €350 million (approx. US$372 million), funded by loans and equity.

Other considerations
The energy generated at this station will supply an estimated 360,000 Madagascan households, with about 2 million inhabitants. During the construction phase, an estimated 1,000 jobs are expected to be created. This power station will increase the population of Madagascar that is connected to grid electricity and propel the country towards the goal of 70 percent nation electrification by 2030.

See also

 List of power stations in Madagascar
 Sahofika Hydroelectric Power Station

References

External links
Map Showing Volobe, Madagascar And Thomasina, Madagascar As of 30 April 2022.

Proposed renewable energy power stations in Madagascar
Proposed hydroelectric power stations
Toamasina Province
Hydroelectric power stations in Madagascar